Jesús Henestrosa Vega (born 19 June 1994) is a Mexican professional footballer who plays as a midfielder.

External links
 
 

Living people
1994 births
Association football midfielders
Chapulineros de Oaxaca footballers
Potros UAEM footballers
Atlético Reynosa footballers
C.D. Veracruz footballers
Alebrijes de Oaxaca players
Liga MX players
Ascenso MX players
Liga Premier de México players
Tercera División de México players
Footballers from Oaxaca
People from Oaxaca City
Mexican footballers